Buenaventura Ferreira Gómez (born 4 July 1960) is a Paraguayan former football striker or midfielder. He played his club football for Club Guaraní, Deportivo Cali of Colombia, Spain's CE Sabadell FC and Bolivian side Oriente Petrolero. He also played in Argentina for Vélez Sársfield and Colón de Santa Fe. Ferreira appeared as an international for Paraguay on several occasions, and was part of the squad that participated in the 1986 FIFA World Cup.

External links
Profile on Weltfussball

1960 births
Living people
Paraguayan footballers
Paraguayan expatriate footballers
Paraguayan football managers
Paraguay international footballers
People from Coronel Oviedo
CE Sabadell FC footballers
Club Guaraní players
Deportivo Cali footballers
Club Atlético Colón footballers
Expatriate footballers in Argentina
Expatriate footballers in Colombia
1986 FIFA World Cup players
1987 Copa América players
1989 Copa América players
Oriente Petrolero players
Expatriate footballers in Bolivia
Oriente Petrolero managers
Paraguayan expatriate sportspeople in Bolivia
Paraguayan expatriate sportspeople in Colombia
Association football midfielders
Royal Pari F.C. managers
Club Sol de América managers
Independiente F.B.C. managers